This is a list of 195 species in Campiglossa, a genus of fruit flies in the family Tephritidae.

Campiglossa species

Campiglossa absinthii (Fabricius, 1805)
Campiglossa achyrophori (Loew, 1869)
Campiglossa aeneostriata (Munro, 1935)
Campiglossa aesia (Walker, 1849)
Campiglossa agatha (Hering, 1956)
Campiglossa albiceps (Loew, 1873)
Campiglossa aliniana (Hering, 1937)
Campiglossa amurensis Hendel, 1927
Campiglossa anchorata (Munro, 1957)
Campiglossa angustipennis (Malloch, 1938)
Campiglossa anomalina (Bezzi, 1924)
Campiglossa aragonensis (Hering, 1934)
Campiglossa argentata (Munro, 1957)
Campiglossa argyrocephala (Loew, 1844)
Campiglossa astuta (Munro, 1957)
Campiglossa basalis (Chen, 1938)
Campiglossa basifasciata (Hering, 1941)
Campiglossa berlandi Séguy, 1932
Campiglossa bigutta (Hering, 1941)
Campiglossa binotata (Wang, 1990)
Campiglossa biplagiata (Hering, 1934)
Campiglossa brunalata (Munro, 1957)
Campiglossa brunneimacula (Hardy, 1988)
Campiglossa cain (Hering, 1937)
Campiglossa californica (Novak, 1974)
Campiglossa cassara (Walker, 1849)
Campiglossa cicerbitae (Hering, 1951)
Campiglossa cisnupchuna Ito, 2011
Campiglossa clathrata (Loew, 1862)
Campiglossa coei (Hardy, 1964)
Campiglossa coloradensis (Quisenberry, 1949)
Campiglossa communis (Chen, 1938)
Campiglossa compta (Munro, 1957)
Campiglossa confinis (Chen, 1938)
Campiglossa conspersa (Wulp, 1900)
Campiglossa contingens (Becker, 1908)
Campiglossa cribellata Bezzi, 1913
Campiglossa defasciata (Hering, 1936)
Campiglossa deserta (Hering, 1939)
Campiglossa despecta (Wulp, 1900)
Campiglossa difficilis (Hendel, 1927)
Campiglossa dirlbekorum Norrbom, 1999
Campiglossa distichera (Wang, 1990)
Campiglossa distincta (Quisenberry, 1949)
Campiglossa dorema (Hering, 1941)
Campiglossa doronici (Loew, 1856)
Campiglossa dreisbachorum (Novak, 1974)
Campiglossa dupla (Cresson, 1907)
Campiglossa duplex (Becker, 1908)
Campiglossa edwardsi (Munro, 1957)
Campiglossa eflorata (Munro, 1957)
Campiglossa enigma (Hering, 1941)
Campiglossa exigua (Chen, 1938)
Campiglossa extincta (Hering, 1944)
Campiglossa farinata (Novak, 1974)
Campiglossa favillacea Ito, 2011
Campiglossa femorata Wang, 1996
Campiglossa fenestrata (Munro, 1957)
Campiglossa festiva (Chen, 1938)
Campiglossa fibulata (Wulp, 1900)
Campiglossa flavescens (Chen, 1938)
Campiglossa floccosa (Curran, 1928)
Campiglossa footei Thompson, 1999
Campiglossa footeorum (Novak, 1974)
Campiglossa fouica (Hering, 1951)
Campiglossa freidbergi Merz, 2000
Campiglossa freyae (Lindner, 1928)
Campiglossa frolica (Dirlbek & Dirlbekova, 1974)
Campiglossa fuscata (Macquart, 1851)
Campiglossa gansuica (Chen, 1938)
Campiglossa gemma (Hering, 1939)
Campiglossa genalis (Thomson, 1869)
Campiglossa gilversa (Wang, 1990)
Campiglossa grandinata (Rondani, 1870)
Campiglossa granulata (Munro, 1957)
Campiglossa guttata (Wiedemann, 1830)
Campiglossa guttella (Rondani, 1870)
Campiglossa guttularis (Wulp, 1900)
Campiglossa helveola (Ito, 1984)
Campiglossa hirayamae (Matsumura, 1916)
Campiglossa hofferi (Dirlbek & Dirlbekova, 1976)
Campiglossa hyalina (Foote, 1979)
Campiglossa ignobilis (Loew, 1861)
Campiglossa igori Korneyev, 1990
Campiglossa intermedia (Zia, 1937)
Campiglossa iracunda (Hering, 1938)
Campiglossa iriomotensis (Shiraki, 1968)
Campiglossa irrorata (Fallén, 1814)
Campiglossa jamesi (Novak, 1974)
Campiglossa japonica (Ito, 1984)
Campiglossa jugosa (Ito, 1984)
Campiglossa kanabaina (Munro, 1957)
Campiglossa kangdingensis Wang, 1996
Campiglossa kaszabi Korneyev, 1990
Campiglossa kumaonesis Agarwal, Grewal et al., 1989
Campiglossa lhommei (Hering, 1936)
Campiglossa lingens (Loew, 1869)
Campiglossa loewiana (Hendel, 1927)
Campiglossa longicauda Wang, 1996
Campiglossa longistigma (Wang, 1990)
Campiglossa lubrica (Dirlbek & Dirlbek, 1971)
Campiglossa luculenta (Wulp, 1900)
Campiglossa luxorientis (Hering, 1940)
Campiglossa lyncea (Bezzi, 1913)
Campiglossa magniceps (Hendel, 1927)
Campiglossa malaris (Séguy, 1934)
Campiglossa lingens (Loew, 1869)
Campiglossa martii (Becker, 1908)
Campiglossa matsumotoi (Shiraki, 1968)
Campiglossa media (Malloch, 1938)
Campiglossa medora (Hering, 1936)
Campiglossa melaena (Hering, 1941)
Campiglossa menyuanana Wang, 1996
Campiglossa messalina (Hering, 1937)
Campiglossa misella (Loew, 1869)
Campiglossa mitrata (Munro, 1957)
Campiglossa montana Korneyev, 1990
Campiglossa multimaculosa (Dirlbek & Dirlbek, 1969)
Campiglossa munroi (Hering, 1937)
Campiglossa murina (Doane, 1899)
Campiglossa nacta (Munro, 1957)
Campiglossa nigricauda (Chen, 1938)
Campiglossa nigrilonga (Dirlbek & Dirlbekova, 1972)
Campiglossa obscuripennis (Loew, 1850)
Campiglossa obsoleta (Wulp, 1900)
Campiglossa occidentalis (Novak, 1974)
Campiglossa occultella (Chen, 1938)
Campiglossa ochracea (Hendel, 1927)
Campiglossa opacipennis (Foote, 1960)
Campiglossa ophelia (Hering, 1944)
Campiglossa ornalibera (Wang, 1990)
Campiglossa pallidipennis (Cresson, 1907)
Campiglossa paula (Hering, 1941)
Campiglossa peringueyi (Bezzi, 1924)
Campiglossa perspicillata Bezzi, 1918
Campiglossa petulans (Munro, 1957)
Campiglossa philippinensis (Hardy, 1974)
Campiglossa plantaginis (Haliday, 1833)
Campiglossa producta (Loew, 1844)
Campiglossa propria (Chen, 1938)
Campiglossa pseudodiluta Korneyev, 1990
Campiglossa punctata (Shiraki, 1933)
Campiglossa punctella (Fallén, 1814)
Campiglossa pusilla (Chen, 1938)
Campiglossa putrida (Hering, 1941)
Campiglossa pygmaea (Novak, 1974)
Campiglossa qinquemaculata Wang, 1996
Campiglossa quadriguttata (Hendel, 1927)
Campiglossa quelpartensis (Kwon, 1985)
Campiglossa reticulata (Becker, 1908)
Campiglossa roscida Ito, 2011
Campiglossa rufula (Chen, 1938)
Campiglossa sabroskyi (Novak, 1974)
Campiglossa sada (Dirlbek & Dirlbekova, 1974)
Campiglossa salina (Munro, 1951)
Campiglossa saltoria (Munro, 1951)
Campiglossa scedelloides Korneyev, 1990
Campiglossa separabilis (Hering, 1941)
Campiglossa shensiana (Chen, 1938)
Campiglossa shiraensis (Munro, 1951)
Campiglossa siamensis (Hardy, 1973)
Campiglossa sigillata (Munro, 1957)
Campiglossa simplex (Chen, 1938)
Campiglossa sinensis Chen, 1938
Campiglossa siphonina (Bezzi, 1918)
Campiglossa snowi (Hering, 1944)
Campiglossa solidaginis (White, 1986)
Campiglossa spenceri (Hardy, 1973)
Campiglossa spinata (Munro, 1957)
Campiglossa stenoptera (Loew, 1862)
Campiglossa steyskali (Novak, 1974)
Campiglossa stigmosa (Meijere, 1916)
Campiglossa subochracea (Séguy, 1934)
Campiglossa suboculata (Séguy, 1939)
Campiglossa taenipennis (Hering, 1941)
Campiglossa tamerlan (Hering, 1938)
Campiglossa tenebrosa (Coquillett, 1899)
Campiglossa tessellata (Loew, 1844)
Campiglossa tolli (Hering, 1937)
Campiglossa transversa Hardy & Drew, 1996
Campiglossa trassaerti (Chen, 1938)
Campiglossa trinotata (Foote, 1979)
Campiglossa trochlina Wang, 1990
Campiglossa turneri Hardy & Drew, 1996
Campiglossa umbrata (Cresson, 1907)
Campiglossa umbritica (Munro, 1957)
Campiglossa undata (Chen, 1938)
Campiglossa varia (Chen, 1938)
Campiglossa variabilis (Doane, 1899)
Campiglossa venezolensis (Hering, 1939)
Campiglossa venusta Dirlbek & Dirlbekova, 1971
Campiglossa virgata (Hering, 1940)
Campiglossa whitei Hardy & Drew, 1996
Campiglossa wolongensis Wang, 1996
Campiglossa zavattarii (Séguy, 1939)

References

Campiglossa